The 12th Congress of the Russian Communist Party (Bolsheviks) was held during 17–25 April 1923 in Moscow. The congress elected the 12th Central Committee. It was attended by 408 delegates with deciding votes and 417 with consultative votes, representing 386,000 party members. This was the last congress of the Russian Communist Party (Bolsheviks) (RCP(b) during Vladimir Lenin's leadership, though Lenin was unable to attend due to illness.

Agenda

 The Central Committee political report (Grigory Zinoviev)
 The Central Committee organizational report (Joseph Stalin)
 Report of the Auditing Commission (Viktor Nogin)
 Report of the Central Control Commission (Matvei Shkiriatov)
 Report of the Russian representation in the Comintern Executive Committee (Nikolay Bukharin)
 About industry (Leon Trotsky)
 National (ethnic-based) issues in party and state development (Joseph Stalin)
 Tax policy in rural areas (Lev Kamenev, Mikhail Kalinin, Grigory Sokolnikov)
 About establishment of districts (raions) (Alexey Rykov)
 Elections of the Party's central offices

Brief overview
Much of this Congress was taken up with Joseph Stalin's struggle against the Georgian Bolshevists. Stalin dominated the Congress with Grigoriy Ordzhonikidze and Mamia Orakhelashvili, moving against the Old Bolsheviks Budu Mdivani and Filipp Makharadze. Stalin accused the latter of the following:

 "violation of party discipline", namely contact Lenin directly not through party channels;
 "disobeying decisions of the Central Committee of the RCP(b)";
 "demanding special economic concessions for Georgia";
 "local chauvinism" and "imperialism" as they were accused of oppressing smaller nations such as the Ossetians and Abkhazians, and,
 "the desire to obtain privileged positions for Georgians".

Ordzhonikidze went further:
 "collaboration with Mensheviks during 1918–1920";
 "retaining class enemies (landlords) in the Georgian Communist Party";
 "granting political amnesty to Mensheviks", and,
  "leftism" and "adventurism".

Aftermath 
Mirsäyet Soltanğäliev attended this Congress, but he was subject to attack immediately afterwards in the Tartar newspaper Eshche and arrested during May 1923. He was roundly condemned by Stalin at the Fourth Conference of the Central Committee of the Russian Communist Party (b) with the Workers of the National Republics of the Regions, held 9–12 June 1923.

At this Congress, the RCP(b) redefined the problems of nationalism identifying local chauvinism as the main problem rather than Great Russian chauvinism. The Congress was the beginning of the so-called policy of Korenizatsiya. The main idea was to grow national cadres for every nationality so that the party line could be pursued everywhere by representatives of the local nationality and the national proletariat could be raised against its own exploiters.

Notes

References 
  
 Muslim National Communism in the Soviet Union by Alexandre Bennigsen and S. Enders Wimbush, University of Chicago Press, 1979.
 Verbatim Report of Stalin's speeches From J. V. Stalin, Works, Foreign Languages Publishing House, Moscow, 1953 Vol. 5, pp. 197–285. Retrieved 26 May 2008.
 The Twelfth Congress of the Russian Communist Party by Nikolai Bukharin, The Communist International, 1923, No. 25, pp. 10–17. Marxists Internet Archive.

Communist Party of the Soviet Union 11
Congress
1923 conferences
April 1923 events